Antony Edwards (1 August 1910 – 23 August 1978) was an English cricketer. He played first-class cricket for Delhi and Maharaja of Cooch-Behar's XI.

See also
 List of Delhi cricketers

References

External links
 

1910 births
1978 deaths
English cricketers
Delhi cricketers
Place of birth missing